Belvatti is a small village situated on the Banks of River [Markandeya] in Belgaum district in the southern state of Karnataka, India.  This Village has population of about 3000, and around voting of 1300.

The main source of income of people in this Village [Belvatti] is Agriculture. Farming of Sugarcane, sweet potatoes, Potatoes, Rice, Cashew nuts, Corn etc. 

Belvatti Village is situated on the borders of [Karnataka, Maharashtra, and Goa] three States, so People in the Village can talk in Kannada fluently. 

The Village [Belvatti] is relocated in the Year 1960 due to the construction of DAM [Rakaskoppa DAM] on the  River [Markandeya].

References

Villages in Belagavi district